Cochetopa National Forest was established in Colorado on July 1, 1908 with , renamed from Cochetopah National Forest.  On May 26, 1930 it received land from Leadville National Forest. On July 1, 1944 Cochetopa was broken up between Gunnison, Rio Grande and San Isabel National Forests.

References

External links
Forest History Society
Forest History Society:Listing of the National Forests of the United States Text from Davis, Richard C., ed. Encyclopedia of American Forest and Conservation History. New York: Macmillan Publishing Company for the Forest History Society, 1983. Vol. II, pp. 743-788.

Former National Forests of Colorado
1908 establishments in Colorado